Robert Beasley was a member of the Virginia House of Burgesses, the elected lower house of the colonial Virginia General Assembly, from Isle of Wight County, in 1655 and 1656.

Upon the petition of Beasley and the other burgesses from Isle of Wight County (Major John Bond and Nicholas Smith), a Commission was established which resulted in Ragged Island and Terascoe Neck being transferred from Nansemond County (then Upper Norfolk County) to Isle of Wight County in 1656.

A descendant of Robert Beasley, Dr. Robert Sanford Beazley (1821–1910), was a member of the Virginia State Convention of 1867–1868, which adopted the Underwood Constitution following the American Civil War. Dr. Beazley also served as a Virginia state senator from Albemarle County and Greene County for four years in 1874–1877.

See also

 House of Burgesses
 List of members of the Virginia House of Burgesses

Notes

References

 Boddie, John Bennett. Seventeenth Century Isle of Wight County, Virginia: A History of the County of Isle of Wight, Virginia, During the Seventeenth Century, Including Abstracts of the County Records. Baltimore: Genealogical Publishing Com, 1973. .
 Brenaman, Jacob Neff. A History of Virginia Conventions, Volume 62. J.L. Hill Printing Company, 1902.
 Early, Ruth Hairston. The Family of Early: Which Settled Upon the Eastern Shore of Virginia and Its Connection with Other Families  Lynchburg, VA: Brown-Morrison, 1920. .
 Morrison, Col. E. M. History of Isle of Wight County 1608-1907. "A Brief History of Isle of Wight County". July 21, 2001. Retrieved April 9, 2014.
 Stanard, William G. and Mary Newton Stanard. The Virginia Colonial Register. Albany, NY: Joel Munsell's Sons Publishers, 1902. , Retrieved July 15, 2011.
 Tyler, Lyon Gardiner, ed. 'Encyclopedia of Virginia Biography'. Volume 1. New York, Lewis Historical Publishing Company, 1915. . Retrieved February 16, 2013.
 Virginia. General Assembly. House of Burgesses, Henry Read McIlwaine, John Pendleton Kennedy, Journals of the House of Burgesses of Virginia, 1619-[1776]. Richmond, VA: Colonial Press, E. Waddey Company, 1915. .
 Virginia State Library. Report of the Virginia State Library, Volumes 13-15. Richmond: Virginia State Library, Division of Purchase and Printing, 1917. .

People from Isle of Wight County, Virginia
Virginia colonial people
House of Burgesses members
Year of birth missing
Year of death missing